Sir Robert Pye (1585–1662) was an English courtier, administrator and politician  who sat in the House of Commons  between 1621 and 1629. He supported the Royalist cause in the English Civil War.

Biography
Pye was the son of Roger Pye of The Mynde at Much Dewchurch in Herefordshire. He became Auditor of the Receipt of the Exchequer under King James I in 1620. In 1621 he was elected Member of Parliament for  Bath and was re-elected for Bath in 1624. In 1625 he was elected MP for Ludgershall and in 1626 he was elected MP for Westminster. He was elected MP for Grampound in 1628.  He purchased the manor and estate of Faringdon, then in Berkshire from the Unton family. 
  
Pye was a supporter of the King and on this account was deprived of his office in 1642.  During the Civil War, he garrisoned his mansion at Faringdon for the Royalists, and it was stoutly besieged, by his own son, Robert who espoused the Parliamentary cause.

Following the Restoration, Pye was restored to his post as Auditor of the Receipt of the Exchequer and held it until his death in 1662  at the age of 77.

Family
Pye married Mary, daughter  of John Croker of Batsford in Gloucestershire they had several children:
Robert  (ca. 1620–1701), his heir, supported Parliament in the Civil War
John (1626–1697), who lived at Hone, in Derbyshire, and became a baronet with the creation of the Baronetcy Pye of Leckhampstead on 27 April 1641.
Mary (fl. 1641–1697), became a nonconformist patron and political activist, and married George Speke (1623–1689).
Anne,  married Edward Phelips

Pye's brother Walter Pye was also an MP.

Notes

References

 

 
 
  

1585 births
1662 deaths
Members of the pre-1707 English Parliament for constituencies in Cornwall
People from Faringdon
Cavaliers
People from Herefordshire
16th-century English people
People from Westminster
People from Bath, Somerset
English MPs 1621–1622
English MPs 1624–1625
English MPs 1625
English MPs 1626
English MPs 1628–1629